Jiang Daming (born 1953) is a politician of the People's Republic of China. He served as the Minister of Land and Resources, and formerly served as Governor of Shandong province.

Career
Jiang was born in Rongcheng, Shandong province. He joined the Chinese Communist Party in 1976, and in 1982 received a bachelor's degree in philosophy from Heilongjiang University. He also received degrees in management at the Harbin Institute of Technology in 1996 and politics at the Central Party School of the Chinese Communist Party in 2001. He has held numerous positions, including in Heilongjiang's production development team, vice-chairman of the All-China Youth Federation, member of the standing committee of the Shandong provincial committee and head of its organization department, vice-secretary and organization department head of the Shandong provincial committee, and Communist Party secretary of Jinan city. In May 2007, he also became secretary of the Shandong government Party group. In June of the same year, he was elevated to vice-governor of Shandong province, and the acting governor. In January 2008, he formally became governor of Shandong province. He was appointed to the Minister of Land and Resources in March 2013.

He was an alternate member of CCP 16th central committee, and a member of CCP 17th and 18th Central Committee.

References

1953 births
Living people
Heilongjiang University alumni
People's Republic of China politicians from Shandong
Politicians from Weihai
Chinese Communist Party politicians from Shandong
Governors of Shandong
Ministers of Land and Resources of China